Yass was an electoral district of the Legislative Assembly in the Australian state of New South Wales between 1894 and 1920. It included the town of Yass. It largely replaced the electoral district of Yass Plains. In 1920, with the introduction of proportional representation, it was absorbed along with Burrangong into Cootamundra. It was recreated in 1930 and replaced by Burrinjuck in 1950.

Members for Yass

Election results

References

Former electoral districts of New South Wales
Constituencies established in 1894
1894 establishments in Australia
Constituencies disestablished in 1920
1920 disestablishments in Australia
Constituencies established in 1930
1930 establishments in Australia
Constituencies disestablished in 1950
1950 disestablishments in Australia